is a Japanese 24-episode anime series produced in 2002 and created by gímik and Gonzo Digimation and directed by Keiji Gotoh. The series is licensed and distributed in North America by FUNimation Entertainment.

On February 26, 2009 it was re-announced under the new title  along with news of a new manga adaptation, .

Overview

Story and setting
Kiddy Grade takes place in a future where the human race has expanded and inhabits a multitude of planets in the universe with fantastic technology. Unsurprisingly, crime has grown alongside technology, and thus the Galactic Organization of Trade and Tariffs (GOTT, German for "God") is formed as a sort of universal police force. Within this organization, there is a special (and secret) branch known as the ES Force (ES standing for "Encounter of Shadow-work"), consisting of twelve physically young people who possess amazing superpowers. Each ES member operates with another as a team, and the series' focus is a team of two low-level members, Éclair and Lumière. As the series progresses, they start to see the darker side of GOTT and its secrets.

Characters

Most of the central characters in the series are ES members of GOTT "Shadow Unit". The Shadow Unit is a group of superpowered individuals that acts as the elite enforcement division of GOTT and hence, of the Galactic Union. Their powers are ranked by "class", of which three are named in the series: C class is the lowest, S is high, and G is the highest. At the beginning of the series, it is believed that no ES member possesses G class abilities but it is later revealed to be false. ES members are organized in pairs of the same class and each is issued a customized and very advanced spaceship and a guard robot.

The protagonists of the series are Éclair and Lumière, a C class pair of ES agents, who have a long back-story together from before joining GOTT. Their past is gradually revealed throughout the series as they come to realize and accept it. Their spaceship is called La Muse and their guard robot is Donnerschlag; both are also part of their back-story. As ES members, Éclair and Lumière report directly to the chief of GOTT, Eclipse, a strict and collected woman whose orders they cannot disobey. Often accompanying them in the early episodes is the Galactic Union auditor Armbrust who appears to have multiple hidden agendas.

Other ES members are: Alv and Dvergr (S class), an arrogant pair who eventually become Éclair and Lumière's antagonists; Tweedledee and Tweedledum (S class), fraternal twins with a complicated relationship towards the protagonists; Viola and Cesario (C class) who are generally on good terms with Éclair and Lumière; Un-ou and A-ou (S class), former mercenaries with a long-standing rivalry with them; and Sinistra and Dextera (S class), a bishōnen pair held in high regard by all their colleagues for their professionalism. Also of note are Mercredi, Eclipse's personal assistant with a hidden agenda, and Chevalier d'Autriche, the Secretary General of GOTT whose past is intertwined with Éclair's.

Media

Anime

Kiddy Grade originally aired on Fuji Television in Japan from October 8, 2002 – March 18, 2003. The series ran for 24 episodes and was produced by Gonzo. The series currently airs on the FUNimation Channel in both its "syndicated block" and its 24-hour channel. In 2007, the series was re-released as three movies (each 80–90 minutes in length) to specific Japanese theatres. The following are the individual titles for each film and their release dates.

Ignition (initial screening April 8, 2007, DVD released July 27, 2007)
Maelstrom (initial screening June 23, 2007, DVD released September 28, 2007)
Truth Dawn (initial screening September 1, 2007, DVD released December 21, 2007)

Crew
 Keiji Gotoh – Director
 Hidefumi Kimura – Scenario
 Megumi Kadonosono – Character design
 Shirō Hamaguchi – Composer

Theme songs
 Opening
  by Yuka
 Ending
 "Future" by Little Viking

Print media
The Kiddy Grade franchise started right in the form of a series of light novels, published by Kadokawa Shoten under the label of Kadokawa Sneaker Bunko from 1 September 2001 to 1 February 2002 and later collected into two volumes (Kiddy Grade Pr1, September 1, 2001 and Kiddy Grade Pr2, February 1, 2002). Following are other light novel dedicated to the characters of the series were published: Kiddy Grade, 3 volumes published from 1 November 2002 to 1 September 2003; Kiddy Grade EX-Partner, single volume published September 25, 2003; and finally Kiddy Grade Secret Affair, single volume published January 29, 2004.

The series was adapted into two manga series. The first, Kiddy Grade Reverse was made by Hiyohiyo and published in the magazine Shonen Ace of Kadokawa Shoten, before being collected in a single volume published on 1 March 2003. The second series, Kiddy Grade Versus was made by Hidefumi Kimura and Arikui Fujimaru and published in the magazine Dragon Jr Kadokawa Shoten, before being collected in two volumes published February 27, 2003 (the first volume) and 1 November 2003 ( the second volume).

See also
 Muses in popular culture

References

Further reading

External links

 
Official FUNimation KIDDY GRADE website

 
2001 Japanese novels
2002 anime television series debuts
2002 Japanese novels
2003 Japanese novels
2003 manga
2004 Japanese novels
2007 anime films
Anime with original screenplays
Films about reincarnation
Funimation
Gonzo (company)
Hidefumi Kimura
Kadokawa Dwango franchises
Light novels
Science fiction anime and manga
Shōnen manga
Yukari Higa